Chitrāngadā (Citrāṅgadā), in the Hindu epic Mahābhārata, was the warrior princess of Manipur and the only heir of king Chitravahana. She had a son named Babhruvahana with Arjuna. The story of Chitrangada is adapted by Indian writer, Rabindranath Tagore in his play, Chitra.

Early life
Manipur was a kingdom in India during Mahabaratha period. It was ruled by a king named Chitravahana. He had a daughter named Chitrangada, whom he named after Madhulika flower. For multiple generations, the dynasty did not have more than one heir. Since Chitravahana did not have any other heir, he trained Chitrangada in warfare and rule. Chitrangada was well-versed in warfare and acquired the skills to protect the people of her land.

Her marriage with Arjuna 
It is not described in Mahabharatha as to how Arjuna, the Pandava prince met Chitrangada. The account is described in Rabindranath Tagore's play Chitra, where Tagore depicts Chitrangada (she had a maid called Sujata) as a warrior dressed in male clothes. Arjuna fell in love with her on account of her honesty and courage. Arjuna's wanderings, during his period of exile, also took him to the ancient kingdom of Manipura. Visiting king Chitravahana, the ruler of Manipura, he beheld his beautiful daughter Chitrangada and fell in love with her. When he approached the king to seek  her hand in marriage, the king told him the story of his ancestor Prabhanjana who was childless and undertook severe austerities to obtain offspring. Finally, Mahadeva appeared to Prabhanjana, granting him the boon that each successive descendant of his race will always have a child, but only one. As Chitravahana's one child was a daughter, he made her his heir according to the customs of his people. This meant that any child she had with Arjuna couldn't be in the Kuru line of succession. Arjuna readily agreed to this condition. Marrying Chitrangada, he stayed with her for three years. When Chitrangada had given birth to a son, Arjuna embraced her  affectionately and took leave of her and her father to resume his wanderings.

Later life
Arjuna left her and returned to Hastinapura, promising her that he would take her back to his kingdom. Chitrangada started bringing up her son Babruvahana. Mahabharata loses mention about Chitrangada  and her kingdom for several chapters. On the other side, the Pandavas went through various ordeals and finally winning the war against the Kauravas. Yudhishthira became the king of Hastinapura. On the advice of sages, he conducted Ashvamedha yagna, where a decorated horse would be sent across the kingdom and wherever it goes unopposed, the land would be acquired by the king who sent it. Arjuna was tasked to take care of the horse. While the horse moved towards the North-east, a young man opposed Arjuna. While Arjuna asked about the identity of the young man, he said he was the prince of the land and that was enough introduction to start a fight. 

A fierce fight started and Arjuna was shocked to see the dexterity with which arrows were pouring at him. He was finally hit by one of the arrows, realizing who Babruvahana was just before being rendered unconscious. Chitrangada came crying to the spot hearing of the incident and she met Arjuna at his death bed. Ulupi, another wife of Arjuna, came to the spot with the Nagamani, a mythical gem capable of bringing back dead men to life. She told Chitrangada  and Babruvahana that Arjuna was cursed by the Vasus that he would be killed by his own son because he was responsible for the fall of Bhishma (the eighth Vasu) and that with the incident he was relieved of his curse. Arjuna was woken up with the stone and he was happy to see both his wives and his son. Arjuna took Ulupi, Chitrangada  and her son Babhruvahana to Hastinapura, where Chitrangada readily became the servant of Gandhari, the aunt of Arjuna. 

Upon the onset of the Kali Yuga, the Pandavas along with Draupadi retired and left the throne to their only heir Arjuna's grandson, Parikshit. Giving up all their belongings and ties, they made their final journey of pilgrimage to the Himalayas, accompanied by a dog. Chitrangada  went back to her kingdom, Manipur.

Literature 
 Citrāngadā in: M.M.S. Shastri Chitrao, Bharatavarshiya Prachin Charitrakosha (Dictionary of Ancient Indian Biography, in Hindi), Pune 1964, p. 213
 The Mahabharata of Krishna Dvaipayana Vyasa, trl. from the original Sanskrit by Kisari Mohan Ganguli, Calcutta 1883-1896
 Chitrangada in: Wilfried Huchzermeyer, Studies in the Mahabharata, edition sawitri 2018, p. 17-19.  (also as E-Book)

References

Characters in the Mahabharata